USC football refers to one of two NCAA Division I FBS college football programs:

South Carolina Gamecocks football of the Southeastern Conference
Southern California Trojans football of the Pac-12 Conference